Dun is a rural parish in Angus, Scotland. It contains the House of Dun, home of the Erskine family and is a stop on the Caledonian Railway. It is located on the river South Esk, west of Montrose and east  of Brechin. In 1785-7 a bridge was built there across the South Esk. The writer Violet Jacob was born at the House of Dun. William Chalmers Burns, a famous Scottish evangelist was born at Dun in 1815.

References

Villages in Angus, Scotland